Ayşegül Günay Aladağ (born October 26, 1992) is a Turkish female basketball player. Currently, she is a member of Botaş SK.

Formerly, Günay played in the youth and junior teams of Migros Spor, Fenerbahçe, Beşiktaş and Çankaya University. In May 2012, she signed with Turkish Women's Basketball League team Kayseri Kaski for two seasons.

In 2012, she won the bronze medal with the Turkey national U-20 team at the Europe Under-20 Championship in Debrecen, Hungary.
Günay was member of the national team, which took the bronze medal at the EuroBasket Women 2013 held in France.

Achievements 
Turkish Junior Women's Basketball Championship
 Fenerbahçe 2009 - 
 Beşiktaş 2011 - 

EuroCup Women
 Kayseri Kaski 2012-13 -

Honors
 2009 Turkish Junior Women's Basketball Championship - "Most Valuable Player"

See also
 Turkish women in sports

References

1992 births
Living people
Abdullah Gül Üniversitesi basketball players
Beşiktaş women's basketball players
Fenerbahçe women's basketball players
Migrosspor basketball players
Sportspeople from İzmit
Point guards
Turkish women's basketball players
20th-century Turkish sportswomen
21st-century Turkish sportswomen